NADC may refer to:

Naval Air Development Center, Johnsville, Pennsylvania.
Graduate of the NATO Defence College.
National Air Defence Corps of Nigeria.
National Australia Day Council.